Billy Joel's Greatest Hits is a collection released in two sets, 12 years apart. The first set, consisting of two discs, titled Volume I and Volume II, was released in 1985. The second, single disc titled Volume III was released in 1997. Additionally a four disc Complete Hits Collection was also released in 1997.

 Greatest Hits – Volume I & Volume II (1985)
 Greatest Hits Volume III (Billy Joel album) (1997)
 The Complete Hits Collection: 1973–1997 (1997)

See also
 Billy Joel discography

Billy Joel compilation albums